Dragan Jovanović (born 4 October 1965) is a Serbian actor.

Career
Dragan graduated from the Faculty of Dramatic Arts in Belgrade in 1990. Since 1990, he has been a  permanent member of the Yugoslav Drama Theatre in Belgrade, where he has appeared in a number of performances, including Baal  as Teddy, Calling Bird as the Devil and Theatre of Illusions as Adrast.

With some of his colleagues he founded the theatre group The Kuguars and as a collective performed Let's play, The funny side of history,  and The funny side of music.

At Budva City Theatre he played Trinculo in The Tempest.

At Zvezdara theatre he played Fran in John's Life, and Alex in The Flames of Passion.

In Madlenianum he directed the play Don Quixote and played the title role.

Filmography

References

External links
 

1965 births
20th-century Serbian male actors
Living people
Male actors from Belgrade
University of Belgrade Faculty of Dramatic Arts alumni
21st-century Serbian male actors
Serbian male stage actors
Serbian male film actors
Serbian male television actors